Kadapa revenue division (or Kadapa division) is an administrative division in the Kadapa district of the Indian state of Andhra Pradesh. It is one of the 4 revenue divisions in the district which consists of 10 mandals under its administration. Kadapa is the administrative headquarters of the division.

Administration 
The 10 mandals in division are:.

History

See also 
List of revenue divisions in Andhra Pradesh
List of mandals in Andhra Pradesh
Kadapa district
Jammalamadugu revenue division
Badvel revenue division
Pulivendula revenue division

References 

Revenue divisions in Kadapa district
Revenue divisions in Andhra Pradesh